Huguette Desjardins (born 27 February 1938) is a Canadian artist. A printmaker, painter and public artist, Desjardins is best known for her public artwork in Montreal's Parc Avenue Metro station, installed in 1983. 

Her work is included in the collection of the National Gallery of Canada.

References

20th-century Canadian women artists
21st-century Canadian women artists
1938 births
Living people
20th-century Canadian artists
21st-century Canadian artists